

Division 5 1969 Dalsland

References 

8
Swedish Football Division 5 seasons